Nick Hurran (born 1959) is a British film and television director. His 1998 film Girls' Night was entered into the 48th Berlin International Film Festival.

Hurran is married to a television producer, Michele Buck, with whom he has two children.

Selected filmography

Film 
 Remember Me?  (1997)
 Girls' Night (1998)
 Virtual Sexuality (1999)
 Plots with a View (2002)
 Little Black Book (2004)
 It's a Boy Girl Thing (2006)

Television 
 The Perfect Match (1995)
 Happy Birthday Shakespeare (2000)
 Take a Girl Like You (2000)
 The Last Detective (2003, 1 episode)
 Walk Away and I Stumble (2005)
 A Class Apart (2007)
 Bonekickers (2008, 1 episode)
 The Prisoner (2009; 6 episodes)
 Doctor Who (2011-2013) :
 The Girl Who Waited
 The God Complex
 Asylum of the Daleks
 The Angels Take Manhattan
 The Day of the Doctor
 Sherlock 
His Last Vow - Nominated - Primetime Emmy Award for Outstanding Directing for a Miniseries, Movie or a Dramatic Special
The Lying Detective
Childhood's End (2015; 3 episodes)
Travelers (2016; 1 episode)
Altered Carbon (2018; 2 episodes)

References

External links 

Living people
1959 births
British film directors
British television directors